KWCX-FM (104.9 FM) is a radio station licensed to Tanque Verde, Arizona, United States. The station is owned by KZLZ, LLC.

The station was licensed for its new facility effective September 14, 2021.

References

External links

WCX-FM